Proviso Township is one of 29 townships in Cook County, Illinois, United States.  As of the 2010 census, its population was 151,704. It was organized in 1850 and originally named "Taylor", but shortly afterward its name was changed to make reference to the Wilmot Proviso, a contemporary piece of legislation intended to stop the spread of slavery.

The Proviso Township government office is located at 4565 W. Harrison Street, Hillside, IL 60162.

Geography

Cities, towns, villages
 Bellwood
 Berkeley
 Broadview
 Brookfield (northwest half)
 Elmhurst (small portions)
 Forest Park
 Hillside
 Hinsdale (small portion)
 La Grange Park
 Maywood
 Melrose Park (vast majority)
 North Riverside (small portions)
 Northlake (south quarter)
 Oak Brook (parts of certain residential lots)
 Stone Park
 Westchester
 Western Springs (only small portion of Village)

Unincorporated Town
 Hines at

Extinct Town
 Harlem at

Adjacent townships
 Leyden Township (north)
 River Forest Township (northeast)
 Berwyn Township (east)
 Oak Park Township (east)
 Riverside Township (southeast)
 Lyons Township (south)
 Downers Grove Township, DuPage County (southwest)
 York Township, DuPage County (west)
 Addison Township, DuPage County (northwest)

Cemeteries
The township contains these fifteen cemeteries: Concordia, Forest Home, Free Sons of Israel, Glen Oak, Immanuel, Joseph and Sons Incorporated, Menorah, Mount Carmel, Oak Ridge, Old Settlers, Parkholm, Queen of Heaven, Waldheim, and Woodlawn.

Major highways
  Interstate 88
  Interstate 290
  Interstate 294
  U.S. Route 12
  U.S. Route 20
  U.S. Route 34
  Illinois Route 38
  Illinois Route 64

Airports and landing strips
 86th USARCOM Heliport
 Chicago Airmail Field (historical)
 Loyola University Medical Center Heliport
 Sauerman Heliport

Landmarks
 Edward Hines Veterans Administration Hospital
 Loyola University Medical Center
 Millers Meadows (Forest Preserve District of Cook County)
 Thatcher Woods (Forest Preserve District of Cook County)
 Wolf Road Prairie (Forest Preserve District of Cook County & Illinois Department of Natural Resources)

Demographics

Education
The following public high school districts serve portions of Proviso Township: Lyons Township (La Grange Park and Western Springs), Riverside-Brookfield (Brookfield, North Riverside and Riverside) and Proviso Township High Schools (Forest Park, Westchester, Maywood, Berkley, Hillside, Melrose Park, Stone Park, Broadview and Bellwood).

Political districts
Illinois' 3rd Congressional District
Illinois' 7th Congressional District
 State House District 07
 State House District 08
 State House District 21
 State House District 41
 State House District 77
 State House District 78
 State Senate District 04
 State Senate District 11
 State Senate District 21
 State Senate District 39
 Cook County Commissioner District 1
 Cook County Commissioner District 16

Company B of the 192nd Tank Battalion
Some graduates of the early 1940s were members of Company B of the 192nd Tank Battalion, an Illinois National Guard Unit, whose involvement in the Bataan Death March during World War II, has been commemorated every year in Maywood since 1942.  137 township residents were killed or captured during the event.

References
 
 United States Census Bureau 2007 TIGER/Line Shapefiles
 United States National Atlas

External links
 Proviso Township official website
 Proviso Township at Illinois.gov
 City-Data.com
 Illinois State Archives
 Township Officials of Illinois
 Cook County official site
 Maywood Bataan Day Organization

Townships in Cook County, Illinois
Townships in Illinois
1850 establishments in Illinois